Cariboo Mountains Provincial Park is a provincial park in British Columbia, Canada, located northeast of Likely.  Comprising 113,469 ha., the park is located in the Cariboo Mountains between Bowron Lakes Provincial Park (NW) and Wells Gray Provincial Park (SE).

The park was established as Mitchell Lake/Niagara Park in 1995.  Its name as changed to Cariboo Mountains Park in 2000.

References

BC Parks webpage

Provincial parks of British Columbia
Cariboo Mountains
Geography of the Cariboo
1995 establishments in British Columbia
Protected areas established in 1995